Jurowce  is a village in the administrative district of Gmina Wasilków, within Białystok County, Podlaskie Voivodeship, in north-eastern Poland.

The village has an approximate population of 500.

References

Jurowce